Tokiwa is both a Japanese surname and a given name. Notable people with the name include:

People with the surname
, Japanese footballer 
, Japanese actress
, Japanese noblewoman
, Japanese photographer
, Japanese voice actor

People with the given name
, Japanese photographer

Japanese-language surnames